Motor Sundaram Pillai is a 1966 Indian Tamil-language drama film directed by S. S. Balan and written by Veppathur Kittoo. A remake of the Hindi film Grahasti (1963), itself based on the American film The Remarkable Mr. Pennypacker (1959), the film stars Sivaji Ganesan, Ravichandran, Sowcar Janaki and Jayalalithaa. It revolves around a man who leads a double life, having two sets of families.

Motor Sundaram Pillai is the directorial debut of Balan, whose father Vasan produced the film under Gemini Studios. After Kittoo completed the screenplay, Ganesan was approached to star but declined; Vasan then produced Kittu's screenplay as Grahasti. When Ganesan saw this film, he offered to act if Kittu made a Tamil version, and was cast.

Motor Sundaram Pillai was released on 26 January 1966. The film was commercially successful, running for over 100 days in theatres.

Plot 

Motor Sundaram Pillai, a man known for being virtuous, leads a double life, having two sets of families.

Cast 

Male cast
 Sivaji Ganesan as Motor Sundaram Pillai
 Ravichandran as Mohan
 Sooryakumar as Vimala's boyfriend
 Sivakumar as Gopal
 Nagayya as Mohan's father
 Sundararajan as Gopal's father
 S. Rama Rao as Station Master
 T. S. Muthaiah
 Deviprasad
 Master S. Kumar
 Nagesh as Shambu
 C. R. Parthiban as Police
 Master C. P. Kumaran as Babu

Female cast
 Sowcar Janaki as Meenakshi
 Jayalalithaa as Mala
 Pandari Bai as Sundaram Pillai's sister
 Kanchana as Kamala
 Rajakokila as elder daughter of Maragadham and Sundaram
 Shylashri as Vimala
 Manimala as Maragadham
 Baby Savithri
 Baby Avandhi
 M. S. Sundari Bai
 Baby Padmini as Rajee
 Baby Kausalya
 Sachu as Revathy

Production 
The 1959 American film The Remarkable Mr. Pennypacker, adapted from a play written by Liam O'Brien, which was inspired by a real life incident, was a global success, especially in Madras (now Chennai). Veppatthur Kittu of Gemini Studios wrote a screenplay based on this film (with changes made to suit regional tastes) and approached Sivaji Ganesan to act. He refused, and Gemini Studios proprietor S. S. Vasan produced Kittu's screenplay in Hindi as Grahasti (1963). When Ganesan saw this film, he offered to act if Kittu made a Tamil version. Vasan later announced the Tamil version, titled Motor Sundaram Pillai. Like Grahasti, this too featured some changes from the American film. It marked the directorial debut of Vasan's son Balan. Cinematography was handled by P. Ellappa.

Soundtrack 
The soundtrack album was composed by M. S. Viswanathan. The lyrics were penned by Kothamangalam Subbu and Vaali. In the song "Gubu Gubu Naan Engine", singer L. R. Eswari imitated engine sounds while A. L. Raghavan imitated train car sounds. The song "Maname Muruganin" is set in the Carnatic raga known as Hindolam. Subbu initially wanted it to be in Atana, but as Viswanathan wanted it to be in Hindolam, Subbu assented. The song was re-used in the Telugu film Manchi Kutumbam (1968) as "Manase Andhala Brindavanam".

Release and reception 

Motor Sundaram Pillai was released on 26 January 1966. T. M. Ramachandran of Sport and Pastime wrote, "Though, up to the interval, it contains the usual quota of songs, dances, romantic chases of the young lovers and comedy [...] it grips the audience with a clever and logical twist in the story." The film was commercially successful, running for over 100 days in theatres.

References

Bibliography

External links 
 

1960s Tamil-language films
1966 directorial debut films
1966 drama films
1966 films
Films scored by M. S. Viswanathan
Films with screenplays by Kothamangalam Subbu
Gemini Studios films
Indian drama films
Indian films based on plays
Indian remakes of American films
Polygamy in fiction
Tamil remakes of Hindi films